Rodney & the Tube Tops were a short-lived American alternative rock band from Seattle, Washington. The band included members of Hole, Sonic Youth and White Flag and was eponymously named after frontman, DJ Rodney Bingenheimer.

Origins and career
The band formed in 1996, while Eric Erlandson's band Hole were on a reported hiatus, and recorded their only single, "I Hate the 90's" at a Seattle-based recording studio in 1996. A minute-long collection of clips from the session was released by drummer Dave Markey in 2008. The single was released a year later on the indie label Sympathy for the Record Industry. The band disbanded soon afterwards.

In 2004, "I Hate The 90's" was featured as part of the soundtrack to the Rodney Bingenheimer documentary, Mayor of the Sunset Strip.

Members
Rodney Bingenheimer - vocals
Eric Erlandson - lead guitar
Thurston Moore - rhythm guitar
Pat Fear - bass
Dave Markey - drums, percussion

Discography
"I Hate the 90's"  - released in 1997, b/w "Tube Tops Forever"/"Cellphone Madness"
Mayor of the Sunset Strip OST - released in 2004

References

Alternative rock groups from Washington (state)
Musical groups established in 1996
Musical groups disestablished in 1997
Sympathy for the Record Industry artists
Musical groups from Seattle